Loxodonta cookei is an extinct species of African elephant. The species name is dedicated to H. Basil S. Cooke, a paleontologist who specialized in extinct African mammals. It is found in Uganda,Tanzania and South Africa. Most of the fossils found from this species were teeth.

References

Miocene proboscideans
Miocene mammals of Africa
Prehistoric elephants
Fossil taxa described in 2007